Aïn Beida Harriche is a town and commune in Mila Province, Algeria. At the 1998 census it had a population of 18,513.

References

Communes of Mila Province